Nossa Senhora Medianeira ("Mediatrix of all graces") is a bairro in the District of Sede in the municipality of Santa Maria, in the Brazilian state of Rio Grande do Sul. It is located in central Santa Maria.

Villages 
The bairro contains the following villages: Condomínio Madre Paulina, Medianeira, Vila Bazzégio, Vila Cândida Vargas, Vila Esperança, Vila Imembuí, Vila Mariana, Vila Medianeira.

Gallery of photos

References 

Bairros of Santa Maria, Rio Grande do Sul